The Medfield Rhododendrons is a  nature reserve established in 1934 in Medfield, Massachusetts managed by the Trustees of Reservations.  The site contains the largest area of Rhododendron maximum in the state, which are currently listed as threatened by the Massachusetts Natural Heritage and Endangered Species Program due to over-collecting.

Gallery

References

External links 
 The Trustees of Reservations: Medfield Rhododendrons

The Trustees of Reservations
Bay Circuit Trail
Open space reserves of Massachusetts
Protected areas of Norfolk County, Massachusetts
Protected areas established in 1934
1934 establishments in Massachusetts
Medfield, Massachusetts